The Museum of Appalachia, located in Norris, Tennessee,  north of Knoxville, is a living history museum that interprets the pioneer and early 20th-century period of the Southern Appalachian region of the United States.  Recently named an Affiliate of the Smithsonian Institution, the museum is a collection of more than 30 historic buildings rescued from neglect and decay and gathered onto  of picturesque pastures and fields. The museum also preserves and displays thousands of authentic relics, maintains one of the nation's largest folk art collections, and hosts performances of traditional Appalachian music and annual demonstrations by hundreds of regional craftsmen.

The museum was established in the 1960s by John Rice Irwin, an East Tennessee educator and businessman, who has followed the basic philosophy of preserving not only structures and artifacts relevant to the region's history, but also preserving each item's individual history— who owned it, when and how it was created or obtained, and how it was used.  These oral histories and recollections are housed, along with thousands of photographs, in the museum's archives.  Starting from a single log structure, the museum has grown over four decades to include buildings such as the National Register of Historic Places-listed Arnwine Cabin, a rare Appalachian cantilever barn, and a cabin once inhabited by the parents of author Mark Twain.  Relics on display include items owned by several notable or colorful Appalachian natives and thousands of tools detailing all aspects of rural life in Southern Appalachia.  The museum's grounds mimic a working pioneer Appalachian farm, with gardens growing typical crops and animals such as goats, chickens, turkeys, and peacocks roaming the grounds freely. “What better way is there to know a people,” Irwin asked, “than to study the everyday things they made, used, mended, and cherished. . . And cared for with loving hands.”

Background
Museum founder John Rice Irwin, a descendant of the region's early settlers (his ancestor, James Rice, built the Rice Gristmill that now stands at Norris Dam State Park), was born at his grandparents' farm along Bull Run Creek in Knox County, Tennessee in 1930.  His family eventually relocated to the Big Valley area of Union County, but were forced to move when the Tennessee Valley Authority acquired their land for the construction of Norris Lake.  His family spent several years in the Gamble Valley community (now part of Oak Ridge), but were forced to move again in the early 1940s when their land was needed for the Manhattan Project.  Irwin was always fascinated by his community's elders, and gathered much of his knowledge of old tools and Appalachian agrarian life from spending time on his grandparents' farm.  Irwin eventually graduated from Lincoln Memorial University and the University of Tennessee, and spent several years as a businessman and educator, including a stint as superintendent of Anderson County public schools.

At an auction of an old local farm in 1962, Irwin noticed that many of the buyers would forever be removing the items from their historical context.  Deciding that the items' true value lay in the history of their usage, Irwin purchased several items, including a horse-shoeing box that had been fished out of the Clinch River in the aftermath of the legendary Big Barren Creek Flood of 1916.  Shortly thereafter, he acquired his first log structure—the General Bunch House—and moved it from its original location in the county's remote New River section.  Irwin spent his weekends seeking out remote communities around the region in search of pioneer relics, which he displayed in his yard and garage.  In 1969, he officially opened the Museum of Appalachia and began charging a nominal admission fee.

In 1977, one of the museum's cabins—the Patterson cabin (also from the New River area)—was used in the television series Young Dan'l Boone, and has since been renamed the "Dan'l Boone Cabin" (although it has no real relation to the famous explorer).  Articles in Parade and Reader's Digest and an appearance by Irwin on the Today Show in the mid-1980s greatly boosted attendance. In the 1980s, Alex Haley visited the museum, and immediately decided to move to East Tennessee (he bought the farm across the street from the museum). Haley was inspired by the museum's Steve Parkey exhibit, and made plans to write a novel about this African-American blacksmith from Southern Appalachia. Haley brought many celebrities to the museum, including Oprah Winfrey, Jane Fonda, Brooke Shields, Lou Gossett Jr., Quincy Jones, and more.

Several episodes of WBIR-TV's documentary program The Heartland Series were taped at the museum, including episodes titled "1791," "Just Another Day," "The Music Tale," "The Toggins," "Frontier Music, Frontier Foods," and "Gift for Jacob." The final show of the series was taped at the museum on August 8, 2009 before an audience estimated at 10,000 people, one of the largest crowds in the museum's history.

Recently, the museum was featured in "American Pickers" and "Antiques Roadshow."

In May 2003, the museum was converted from private ownership to a non-profit foundation operating under the direction of a board of directors. The museum attracts about 100,000 visitors annually. It currently maintains over 250,000 artifacts.

Displays

Open-air and log building displays
Along with cabins and barns, the museum displays most types of buildings that would be found on a typical pioneer Appalachian farm, including smokehouses, corn cribs, animal pens, mills, an underground dairy and cellar, and a loom house.  Blacksmith shops, a working saw mill, a rural schoolhouse, a log church, a broom and rope shop, and a leather shop— all fully equipped with contemporary materials— are also on display and are occasionally used for demonstrations.  One cabin, the McClung house, displays early 20th-century items from around the region.  Others, such as the Parkey blacksmith shop (built by an African-American farmer from Hancock County) and the Hagood leather and saddle shop, display items that belonged to the building's original owner.  Various artifacts are scattered along the path, including a salt kettle from a salt works in Saltville, Virginia destroyed during the U.S. Civil War and a cedar trunk from Friendsville used to attract wild honey bees.

Display Barn
The museum's two-story Display Barn houses one of the nation's largest collections of pioneer frontier relics.  Along with thousands of relics, the barn contains a fully stocked general store setting and a rural post office from Arthur, Tennessee (near Harrogate).  Tools on display include an axe that may have been used at colonial Fort Loudoun, the shoeing box fished out of the Clinch in the wake of the Big Barren Creek Flood, and thousands of other tools related to all aspects of rural life in pioneer and early-20th century Appalachia.  The collection includes photographs and short descriptions that detail each item's original owner and usage.

Appalachian Hall of Fame
The two-story Appalachian Hall of Fame building preserves items associated with famous or otherwise colorful individuals from the Appalachian region.  Exhibits display items owned by individuals such as Alvin C. York, Cordell Hull, Roy Acuff, and Uncle Dave Macon, as well as various local legends.  A large room is dedicated to Appalachian music, and displays dozens of different types of banjos, Appalachian dulcimers, and other instruments.  One instrument, the so-called "Murder Banjo," was played by a late-19th-century African-American banjo player named Henry Dobson and gets its name from an incident in which Dobson's friend was stabbed to death at a party at which Dobson was playing, splattering blood all over the banjo.

The People's Building

The People's Building houses the Henry Harrison Mayes exhibit, the Christy Exhibit, and the museum's folk art exhibit.  Harrison Mayes (1898–1986), a Kentucky coal miner-turned-evangelist, spent nearly 70 years placing religious signs along highways across the nation after he was nearly killed in a mining accident in 1918.  The Catherine Marshall novel Christy takes place in the remote Chapel Hollow community a few miles west of Del Rio, Tennessee in the early 20th century, and part of the 1990s CBS television series Christy was filmed at the museum.  The museum's folk art collection features an exhibit by Monroe County master woodcarver James Bunch, as well as various murals, jugs, and furniture from around the region.

Events and festivals

The museum helps preserve Appalachian history and culture by hosting a variety of events throughout the year.

"Sheep Shearing Days," an annual springtime event, features a plethora of hands-on activities, including demonstrations of carding, spinning, weaving, and other ways that pioneers used wool.

"July 4th Celebration & Anvil Shoot." The Museum of Appalachia celebrates Independence Day by launching a gunpowder-filled anvil high into the sky. "Anvil shooting" was once a common way for pioneers to celebrate special events.

"Days of the Pioneer" Antique Show." A premier antique show and sale displaying the finest selection of 18th and 19th century American antiques from over 60 of the nation's premium dealers. The event also features traditional craftsmen demonstrating pioneer skills, mountain music, Revolutionary and Civil War encampments, and more.

"A Candlelight Christmas." Tour the museum village by candlelight, enjoy Appalachian Christmas stories, drink hot cider, sing carols in the Irwin Chapel, and more.

For 38 years, the museum hosted an event called "Tennessee Fall Homecoming." Considered one of the nation's largest, most authentic music and folk festivals, Homecoming featured dozens of acclaimed musicians performing all-day on four outdoor stages, as well as evening performances by headlining artists. Bill Monroe, Earl Scruggs, Marty Stuart, Old Crow Medicine Show, Lee Ann Womack, Jerry Douglas, The SteelDrivers, Ralph Stanley, John Hartford, Doc Watson, and Rhonda Vincent are a few of the artists that performed at Homecoming.

Homecoming also showcased old-time mountain demonstrations, heritage artisans and crafters.

Notable buildings

Arnwine Cabin

The Arnwine Cabin was built using hewn poplar logs between 1795 and 1820, and its first known occupant was John Wesley Arnwine.  The cabin was originally located along the Clinch River near the Liberty Hill community in Grainger County.  In the early 1930s, the Tennessee Valley Authority acquired the cabin's  tract for the construction of Norris Lake, and the cabin was moved a short distance.  Two of Arnwine's daughters, Polly Anne (d. 1923) and Eliza Jane (d. 1936) lived in the cabin their entire lives, and after Eliza Jane's death the cabin was used for storage and fell into ruin.  John Rice Irwin acquired the cabin in 1964 and moved it to the present museum site.

Irwin decided the roof could not be salvaged, so he and two associates split 5,400 shingles from a single red oak tree and built the present roof.  The cabin's floor was also missing, so Irwin located a contemporary puncheon floor at a smokehouse near Sneedville and moved it to the Arnwine Cabin.  The stone part of the cabin's chimney was moved from the ruins of a contemporary house in the Laurel Grove community just north of the museum, and a stick-and-mud section was added.  Over several years, the cabin was outfitted with authentic furniture, tools, and utensils from the region's pioneer period.

In 1976, the Arnwine Cabin was listed on the National Register of Historic Places.

Mark Twain family cabin
The "Mark Twain family cabin" is believed to have belonged to Twain's father, John Clemens, and may have been where the author's older siblings were born and where the author himself was conceived (the Clemens family moved to Missouri a few months before he was born).  The cabin was originally located in the Possum Trot community in Fentress County, Tennessee, where John Clemens served as a post master and circuit court clerk.  The cabin's chimney was added around 1905.  The Museum of Appalachia purchased and moved the cabin to the museum in 1995.

Comprehensive list of historical structures

See also
Open-air museum
 List of music museums
Great Smoky Mountains Heritage Center

References

External links

Museum of Appalachia (official site)
Smithsonian Institution — affiliate page
Museum of Appalachia - Tennessee Encyclopedia of History & Culture
YouTube — Museum of Appalachia's channel

Agriculture museums in the United States
Appalachian culture in Tennessee
Culture of the Southern United States
Folk art museums and galleries in Tennessee
History of Tennessee
Living museums in Tennessee
Log cabins in the United States
Museums in Anderson County, Tennessee
Open-air museums in Tennessee
Rural history museums in Tennessee
Rural history museums in the United States
Log buildings and structures on the National Register of Historic Places in Tennessee
Music of East Tennessee
Museums established in 1969
1969 establishments in Tennessee
Slave cabins and quarters in the United States